Gombaran (also Romanized as Gombarān; also known as Gomerān) is a village in Salakh Rural District, Shahab District, Qeshm County, Hormozgan Province, Iran. At the 2006 census, its population was 436, in 88 families.

References 

Populated places in Qeshm County